The Vietnam water snake or Chapa flat-nosed snake (Hebius chapaensis) is a species of colubrid snake. It is found in northern Vietnam and Yunnan, southern China.

References 

Hebius
Snakes of China
Snakes of Vietnam
Reptiles described in 1934
Taxa named by René Léon Bourret